Šamorín is a small town in western Slovakia, southeast of Bratislava.

Etymology
The name is derived from a patron saint of a local church Sancta Maria, mentioned for the first time as villa Sancti Marie (1285). Today's name is an adaptation of the original name: Zent Maria – Samaria – Somoria – Šamorín.

Geography
Administratively, the town belongs to the Trnava Region, Dunajská Streda District.

History
The oldest artifacts indicating the settlement of the area are dated to the Neolithic and Eneolithic Period.  
The settlement of the location is documented also for the Bronze Age and the Iron Age. Later archaeologic research (2008) uncovered  artifacts from the Early and High Middle Ages (remnants of settlements, dwellings, farm buildings).

After the Mongol invasion, the village was settled by German "guests" who had the leading role in the town administration. The German minority was given a royal privilege to apply Pressburg Law (now Bratislava) and lived in the town until the end of the Middle Ages. The presence of other ethnic groups like Pechenegs and Székelys is also documented.

The small Hungarian town was mentioned for the first time in 1238 as ecclesia Sancte Mariae and was a prominent port by the Danube during the Middle Ages and the market center of Rye Island. Agriculture also played a major role in the town's development. As a result of this prosperity, its citizens enjoyed a brisk trade in the new technologies and many shipyards on the Danube. However, with rise of Pressburg, the importance of the town began declining. Šamorín eventually lost its right to the status of royal free city granted in 1405 during the reign of Hungarian King Sigismund.  In the sixteenth century, the city became notable again because of the witch trials held there.
After the Austro-Hungarian army disintegrated in November 1918, Czechoslovak troops occupied the area, later acknowledged  internationally (contested by Hungary) by the Treaty of Trianon. Between 1938 and 1945 Šamorín (Somorja) once more became a part of Hungary under Miklós Horthy through the First Vienna Award. From 1945 until the Velvet Divorce, it was part of Czechoslovakia. Since then it has been part of Slovakia.

Demography
According to the 2014 census, the municipality had 13,028 inhabitants. In 2011 7,309 (56.1%) of the inhabitants were Hungarians, 4,365 (33.51%) Slovaks,  63 (0.48%) Czechs and 989 others were unspecified.
In 1910, the town had a total population of 2,930, which included 2,699 (92.12%) Hungarians, 112 (3.82%) Germans and 114 (3.89%) Slovaks.
According to the 1991 census, ethnic groups included 71% Hungarians and 27.4% Slovaks.
According to the 2001 census, ethnic groups included 66.63% Hungarians and 30.96% Slovaks.
According to the 2021 census, ethnic groups included 49.55% Hungarians and 41.11% Slovaks.

The religious make-up in 2001 was 75.27% Roman Catholics, 4.42% Protestant, 11.75% without denomination and others. In 2021 it was 45.32% Roman Catholics, 3.31% Protestant, 29.9% without denomination.

Landmarks
The Reformed Church, originally Catholic and built in the 13th century in the late Romanesque style.
The Catholic Church and its former cloister from the 18th century in the Baroque style. 
The Protestant Church of 1784 
The Synagogue, built in 1912 in a Romanesque Revival style  
The Renaissance-style city hall

Municipal division
Šamorín has five districts: Šamorín proper and the villages of Bučuháza, Čilistov, Kráľovianky, and Mliečno.

Historically incorporated villages
1808: Gančháza 
1960: Čilistov
1976: Mliečno

Notable people
Livia Bitton-Jackson (born 1931), Holocaust survivor and author, writing a three-part series on her journey from Šamorín to New York City
Pál Skriba (1932–2004), Hungarian painter and teacher
Tibor Linka (born 1995), sprint canoer, won a gold medal at the 2015 World Championships and a silver medal at the 2016 Olympics

Twin towns — sister cities

Šamorín is twinned with:
 Mosonmagyaróvár, Hungary
 Hainburg an der Donau, Austria
 Gheorgheni, Romania
 Leiderdorp, The Netherlands

References
The information in this article is based on that in its German equivalent.
Notes

External links
 Official website 

Populated places on the Danube
Cities and towns in Slovakia
Hungarian communities in Slovakia